Hanning is a surname. Notable people with the surname include:

Loy Hanning, Major League Baseball pitcher. 
Reinhold Hanning (1921 – 2017) – Germany (Poland) – Auschwitz death camp guard.
Rob Hanning, American television writer and producer.
Robert W. Hanning, American medievalist.

See also
Hann function, a discrete window function.
John Hanning Speke